Events from the 1580s in Denmark.

Incumbents
 Monarch – Frederick II (until 1588), Christian IV

Events
1580
 3 February – A great fire destroys a large part of Ribe. 11 streets and 213 houses burn down.

1581
 The Kronborg Tapestries are commissioned. They are completed in 1596.

1588
 The Dutch architect Philip Brandin oversees the construction of a new Nykøbing Castle.

Births
1580
 8 April – Augusta of Denmark, princess of Denmark and Duchess of Holstein-Gottorp (died 1639)
1581
 5 August – Hedwig of Denmark, princess of Denmark and Electress of Saxony (died 1641 in Saxony)
 4 November – Christen Friis, nobleman (died 1639)
 26 November – Frederick, Duke of Schleswig-Holstein-Sønderburg-Norburg (died 1658)
1583
 2 January – Falk Lykke, nobleman (died 1650)
 24 February – Margaret of Schleswig-Holstein-Sonderburg, Countess Consort of Nassau-Siegen (died 1658 in Siegen)
 9 July – John, Prince of Schleswig-Holstein, prince of Denmark (died 1602)
1584
 15 March – Philip, Duke of Schleswig-Holstein-Sonderburg-Glücksburg (died 1663)

1585
 12 February – Caspar Bartholin the Elder, polymath (died 1629)
 5 August – Jesper Brochmand, theologian and Bishop of Zealand (died 1652)
 Undated – Lorenz van Steenwinckel, architect (died 1619)
1587
 2 January – Anders Arrebo, poet and bishop of Trondhjem (died 1637)
 24 June – Hans van Steenwinckel the Younger, architect (died 1639)
1588
 13 May – Ole Worm, physician and antiquary (died 1655)
Undated

 Mogens Pedersøn (c. 1583) – instrumentalist and composer (died 1623)
 Esaias Fleischer (c. 1586) – pharmacist (died 1663)

Deaths
1580
 1 October – John the Elder, prince of Denmark and Duke of Schleswig-Holstein-Haderslev (born 1521)
1581
 11 July – Peder Skram, naval admiral (born c. 1497)
1583
 26 December – Jørgen Lykke, nobleman (born 1515)
1584
 20 September – Hans Svaning, historian (born 1503)
1585
 20 November   Eiler Grubbe, statesman and landholder(born 1532)
1586
 20 March – Elisabeth of Brunswick-Grubenhagen, duchess of Schleswig-Holstein-Sonderburg (born 1550 in Brunswick-Lüneburg)

 1 October – Adolf, Duke of Holstein-Gottorp, Prince of Denmark (born 1526)
 15 October – Elizabeth of Denmark, princess of Denmark and a Duchess of Mecklenburg (born 1524)
1587
 2 November – Hans Knieper, Flemish court artist
1588
 4 April – Frederick II, King of Denmark and Norway (born 1534)
1589
 18 January – Magnus Heinason, Faroese sailor and privateer (born 1548)
 15 February – Anne Hardenberg, courtier and lady-in-waiting (born c. 1539)
Undated

 Melchior Lorck (c. 1583) – painter and printmaker (born c. 1526)

References

 
Denmark
Years of the 16th century in Denmark